John Boak (27 June 1837 – 29 October 1876) was a Scottish cricketer.  Boak was a right-handed batsman bowled right-arm fast.  He was born at Edinburgh and educated at the Royal High School.

Boak made his only first-class appearance for Middlesex against the Marylebone Cricket Club at Lord's in 1873.  In his only first-class match, he scored 19 runs at a batting average of 9.50, with a high score of 11.  In the field he took 2 catches.  With the ball he took a single wicket at a bowling average of 37.00, with best figures of 1/20.

Prior to his single first-class match, Boak emigrated to Australia in 1858.  While there he played initially for a combined New South Wales and Victoria in the 1861/62 season.  In the 1863/64 season, Boak played for New South Wales and the following season for Queensland.  His matches for both New South Wales and Queensland came before either state held first-class status.  He later returned to England in 1868.

Three years after playing for Middlesex, Boak was killed when he was hit by a train while crossing a railway line in Bermondsey, London on 29 October 1876.

References

External links
John Boak at Cricinfo
John Boak at CricketArchive

1837 births
1876 deaths
Cricketers from Edinburgh
People educated at the Royal High School, Edinburgh
Scottish cricketers
Middlesex cricketers
Railway accident deaths in England
Accidental deaths in London